USS John F. Kennedy (CVN-79) is the second  built for the United States Navy. The ship  was launched on 29 October 2019, and christened on 7 December 2019.

Naming
On 7 December 2007, the 66th anniversary of the Attack on Pearl Harbor, Arizona Congressman Harry Mitchell proposed naming this ship . In 2009, Arizona Congressman John Shadegg proposed naming either CVN-79 or the subsequent CVN-80 as Barry M. Goldwater, after the late U.S. Senator, also from Arizona.
On 29 May 2011, the Department of Defense announced that the ship would be named for John F. Kennedy, the 35th President of the United States, who served in the navy during World War II. She will be the third navy ship named after members of the Kennedy family, and the second aircraft carrier named John F. Kennedy, succeeding , which was active from 1968 to 2007.

Construction

On 15 January 2009, Huntington Ingalls Industries (HII) Northrop Grumman Shipbuilding was awarded a $374 million contract for design work and construction preparation for John F. Kennedy. On 30 September 2010, Northrop Grumman announced that preparations were under way to begin construction. On 25 February 2011, the Navy conducted the First Cut of Steel ceremony at Northrop Grumman in Newport News, signalling the formal start of construction for John F. Kennedy.

John F. Kennedy was originally planned to be completed in 2018. This was extended to 2020 after Secretary of Defense Robert Gates announced in 2009 that the program would shift to a five-year building program so as to place it on a "more fiscally sustainable path". By late 2012, delays had occurred in construction, and the Navy Department was investigating extending the construction time of both  and John F. Kennedy by an additional two years which could delay the carrier's entry into service until 2022. In September 2013, the Government Accountability Office recommended delaying the detail design and construction contract for John F. Kennedy until programmatic shortfalls are sorted out. The Navy and Defense Department have rejected the recommendation. The Navy faces technical, design, and construction challenges to completing , including producing systems prior to demonstrating their maturity to meet required installation dates. Gerald R. Ford had costs increase by 22% to $12.8 billion, and additional increases could follow due to uncertainties facing critical technology systems and shipbuilder under performance. Risk is introduced in the Navy's plan to conduct integration testing of key systems at the same time as initial operational test and evaluation. One action the GAO says could be taken to ensure Ford-class carrier acquisitions are supported is conducting a cost-benefit analysis of required capabilities and associated costs.

The ship's keel was laid in Newport News, Virginia on 22 August 2015.  As part of the traditional keel laying ceremony, the initials of ship sponsor Caroline Kennedy, daughter of President Kennedy and the sponsor of the previous John F. Kennedy, were welded into the ship's hull. As of late June 2017 the ship was 50% structurally complete. On 28 February 2018, Huntington Ingalls Industries announced that its Newport News Shipbuilding division had built 70% of the structures necessary to complete John F. Kennedy. On 30 April 2018, Huntington Ingalls Industries announced that she was "75 percent structurally erected and more than 40 percent complete." On 3 May 2018 Huntington Ingalls President & CEO Mike Petters reported that John F. Kennedy was to be launched three months ahead of schedule on 29 October 2019. On 30 May 2019 the 588-ton bridge and island was installed. Under the island Captain Todd Marzano placed his wings and the first Kennedy half dollar, which was donated by Caroline Kennedy, was put in place. Next to these Rear Admiral Brian Antonio (program executive officer, Aircraft Carriers, ret.), Rear Admiral Roy Kelley (commander, Naval Air Force Atlantic), and Jennifer Boykin (president, Newport News Shipbuilding) placed coins each embossed with quotes from President Kennedy and parts of the ship's motto. Caroline could not be present, so the order was given via radio for the crane operator to lift the island and set it down on the deck over the ceremonial items and entombing them in the ship's superstructure. The ship reached 100% complete on 11 July 2019 with the installation of the upper bow and launch deck consisting of the ship's two forward catapults.

On 1 October 2019, the ship's crew was activated for the first time as Pre-Commissioning Unit (PCU) John F. Kennedy at a ceremony aboard the vessel at Newport News Shipbuilding. On 29 October 2019, Newport News Shipbuilding began flooding the dry dock where John F. Kennedy has been under construction. Once the ship was afloat, she was moved to west end of the dry dock. The ship was christened on 7 December 2019 by Caroline Kennedy, who reenacted the bottle bash she did when the first John F. Kennedy (CV-67) was christened 52 years earlier.

In November 2020, Huntington Ingalls Industries received a nine-figure modification on an earlier contract to accomplish CVN 79 "single phase delivery and Joint Strike Fighter (F-35C) capabilities" in Newport News, Virginia. According to the contract announcement, the "single-phase delivery approach" is adopted "to meet both Fleet requirements and a congressional mandate of ensuring that CVN 79 is capable of operating and deploying Joint Strike Fighter (F-35C) aircraft before completing the post-shakedown availability as codified in Section 124 of the fiscal 2020 National Defense Authorization Act (Public Law 116-92)." The ship is projected to begin testing her Electromagnetic Aircraft Launch System in 2022.

See also

 List of aircraft carriers of the United States Navy
 List of memorials to John F. Kennedy

References

External links

 DoD press release on christening of CVN-79 John F. Kennedy
 Builder Website

 

Gerald R. Ford-class aircraft carriers
Ships built in Newport News, Virginia
2019 ships
Monuments and memorials to John F. Kennedy in the United States